Crown Confectionery is a confectionery company headquartered in Jamwon-dong Seocho-gu Seoul, Korea and it was established in 1947. Its manufacturing is based in Jungrang-gu Seoul and Anyang Gyeonggi-do. It is historically an old popular biscuit brand because they invented Sando and Big Pie. It is similar to Lotte Confectionery, Haitai which Crown Confectionery took over in 2004, and Orion Confectionery. Crown Confectionery produces biscuit, cookies, crackers, chocolates and other snacks and confectioneries. division in 2017 Crown Confectionery, Change of existing company name Crown Haitai Hoildings.

See also
Economy of South Korea
List of companies of South Korea

References

External links
Crown Confectionery homepage (in Korean)

Food and drink companies of South Korea
Confectionery companies of South Korea
Manufacturing companies based in Seoul
Food and drink companies established in 1947
South Korean brands
South Korean companies established in 1947